Sir Neil Cossons  FMA (born 15 January 1939) is a British historian and museum administrator.

Biography
Cossons was born in Beeston and studied at the University of Liverpool.

He was the first director of the Ironbridge Gorge Museum Trust from 1971 and then at the National Maritime Museum, Greenwich from 1983. From 1986 to 2000 he was the director of the Science Museum, London, (awarded Science Museum Fellowship 2019) UK. From 1989-95, and 1999-2000 he was an English Heritage commissioner. He was pro-provost and chairman of  council of the Royal College of Art from 2007 until 2015. In 2000, he took over as chairman of English Heritage, a post he held to 2007.

He was one of the founders of the Association of Independent Museums (AIM) and its chairman from 1978 to 1983 when he was appointed president, a position he still holds.
Cossons was appointed an Officer of the Order of the British Empire (OBE) in 1982 and knighted for services to museums and the heritage in 1994. He is a Fellow of the Museums Association (FMA 1970) and a Life Fellow of the Society of Antiquaries of London (FSA 1968). A member of the Newcomen Society for the history of engineering and technology since 1963, Cossons was president from 2001–03 and awarded the society's Dickinson Memorial Medal in 2001. In 2016, he was appointed a Trustee of the National Heritage Memorial Fund/Heritage Lottery Fund.
 
Other appointments include: president of the Association for Industrial Archaeology (1977–80); member of the Design Council (1990–94); non-executive director of British Waterways Board (1995-2001); Collier Professor in the Public Understanding of Science in the University of Bristol (2001–02); president of the Royal Geographical Society (2003-2006) He has been an honorary professor at the University of Birmingham since 1994. Cossons holds honorary doctorates from fourteen British universities, was awarded the President's Medal of the Royal Academy of Engineering in 1993, and appointed an honorary fellow of the RIBA in 2002.

Cossons is "Britain's leading authority on the industrial heritage" and has advised on matters of conservation and management widely in the UK and overseas.

Publications

References

1939 births
Living people
People from Beeston, Nottinghamshire
English curators
Fellows of the Society of Antiquaries of London
Officers of the Order of the British Empire
Knights Bachelor
Directors of museums in the United Kingdom
Directors of the National Maritime Museum
Directors of the Science Museum, London
Ironbridge Gorge
People educated at Henry Mellish Grammar School
Fellows of the Royal Geographical Society
Presidents of the Royal Geographical Society
Presidents of the Association for Science Education
Fellows of the Museums Association
Industrial archaeology
Museum administrators